Andrein is a commune in the Pyrénées-Atlantiques department in the Nouvelle-Aquitaine region of south-western France.

The inhabitants of the commune are known as Andreinais or Andreinaises

Geography

Location
Andrein is a béarnaise commune located on the left bank of the Gave d'Oloron 5 kilometres east of Sauveterre-de-Béarn and some 16 km south-west of Orthez. Access to the commune is by road D27 from Sauveterre-de-Bearn passing through the commune and the village and continuing east to Laàs. The D23 road from Burgaronne to L'Hôpital-d'Orion also passes through the north of the commune. The commune is mixed forest and farmland.

Hydrography
Located in the Drainage basin of the Adour, the southern border of the commune is formed by the Gave d'Oloron. Numerous streams flow south through the commune to the Gave d'Oloron including the Malourau and the Lourou which forms the eastern border. The northern border is formed by the Arrec Heurre which flows west to eventually join the Gave d'Oleron east of Abitain.

Localities and hamlets

 Araspy
 Arrouzère
 Bachoué Château
 Baillenx
 Balespet
 La Baronnie
 Bétouzet
 Bonnemaison
 Bordenave (2 places)
 Braile
 Les Camous
 Casamayou
 Castagnède
 Casteret
 Charrie
 Cousté
 Esploubet
 Hieyte
 Hourcade
 Hourquet
 Laborde
 Lagouarde
 Lauga
 Lée
 Louhau
 Lourou
 Loustau
 Maysonnave
 Monplaisir
 Moulinau
 Pellou
 Pouyau
 Quartier de Pouyau
 La Salle
 Sarrail
 Suberborde
 Temboury
 Téoulé
 Tinguerot
 Touroun.

Neighbouring communes and villages

Toponymy
The commune name in Béarnese dialect and in Gascon Occitan is Andrenh. Brigitte Jobbé-Duval indicated that the name actually came from the family name Andréas with the suffix -enh. She also mentioned that the villagers were once called "cherry eaters".

The following table details the origins of the commune name and other names in the commune.

Sources:
Raymond: Topographic Dictionary of the Department of Basses-Pyrenees, 1863, on the page numbers indicated in the table. 

Origins:
Census: Census of Béarn
Reformation: Reformation of Béarn
Insinuations: Insinuations of the Diocese of Oloron 
Navarrenx: Notaries of Navarrenx
Denombrement: Denombremont of Andrein

History
Paul Raymond on page 6 of his 1863 dictionary noted that the commune had a Lay Abbey, a vassal of the Viscounts of Béarn.
 
In 1385 Andrein reported 17 fires and depended on the bailiwick of Sauveterre.

Administration

List of Successive Mayors

Inter-communality
The commune is part of five intercommunal structures:
the inter-communal centre for Social Action of Sauveterre-de-Béarn;
the Communauté de communes du Béarn des Gaves;
the inter-communal association for the Gaves and of Saleys;
the AEP association for the Saleys region;
the energy association for Pyrénées-Atlantiques

Demography
In 2017 the commune had 131 inhabitants.

Economy

Economic activity is mainly agricultural. The town is part of the Appellation d'origine contrôlée (AOC) zone of Ossau-iraty.

Culture and Heritage

Environmental heritage
The Touron de Larochelle is 195 metres high.

Notable people linked to the commune
Emmanuel Berl, born 2 August 1892 in Vésinet (Seine-et-Oise) and died 21 September 1976 in Paris, was a journalist, historian and French essayist. In 1920 he married Jacqueline Bordes in Andrein.
Arthur Hugenschmidt (1862-1929) stayed in Andein in 1928 and 1929 with the Countess of Viforano (daughter of Dr. Joseph Marie Alfred Beni-Barde) according to correspondence from the Presidency of the Republic.

See also
Communes of the Pyrénées-Atlantiques department

References

External links
Andrein on Géoportail, National Geographic Institute (IGN) website 
Andrein on the 1750 Cassini Map

Communes of Pyrénées-Atlantiques